Cyperus lundellii is a species of sedge that is native to parts of southern parts of North America and parts of Central America.

See also 
 List of Cyperus species

References 

lundellii
Plants described in 1940
Flora of Mexico
Flora of Belize
Flora of Guatemala